LTM may refer to:
 LTM, IATA code for Lethem Airport, Guyana
 LTM Recordings, British record label
 Long-term memory, memory that can be stored as little as a few days or as long as decades
 Leica thread-mount, an M39 screw lens mount introduced by Leitz Camera in the 1930s
 Last Twelve Months, a financial term also known as trailing twelve months
 Local Traffic Manager, a web networking term synonymous with the term "load balancer"
 Logical Technology Model, term used in solution architecture to describe high-level hardware infrastructure
Lake of Two Mountains High School
 Limited Time Mode in video games like Fortnite Battle Royale or Rocket League
 London Transport Museum, Transport Museum in London, United Kingdom
 ltm (gene), several lolitrem biosynthesis genes